The Oliver–Eakle–Barfield Building is an historic building located at 600 South Polk Street in Amarillo, Texas. The building was listed on the National Register of Historic Places on January 11, 2019.

The building was converted into the Barfield Hotel in 2019.

See also
 National Register of Historic Places listings in Potter County, Texas

References

Buildings and structures in Amarillo, Texas
National Register of Historic Places in Potter County, Texas